A definitive map is a record of public rights of way in England and Wales. In law it is the definitive record of where a right of way is located. The highway authority (normally the county council, or unitary authority in areas with a one-tier system) has a statutory duty to maintain a definitive map. In national parks, the National Park Authority usually maintains the map. The Inner London boroughs are exempt from the statutory duty, though they have the powers to maintain a map: currently none does so.
Details of the definitive map process are set out in the Natural England document A guide to definitive maps and changes to public rights of way.

Each right of way also has a written description referred to as the definitive statement. Generally the definitive map takes legal precedence over the definitive statement.

Examples of Definitive Maps

References

External links
  Public Paths and the Definitive Map from the Ramblers Association
  Definitive Map Orders: Consistency Guidelines from the Planning Inspectorate
  List of online Definitive Maps for each UK county
  Natural England document A guide to definitive maps and changes to public rights of way

Road transport in the United Kingdom
Maps of the United Kingdom
Walking in the United Kingdom
Footpaths in the United Kingdom